Crab Island is an island located in the mouth of the Berbice River in Guyana, located at .

Crab Island is so named due to the presence of numerous crabs there, and is approximately one mile in circumference. Before the British took over Berbice in 1815, the Dutch had a fort here called St. Andries.

References

Islands of Guyana